George Clarke (born 27 May 1974) is an English architect, television presenter, lecturer and writer, best known for his work on the Channel 4 programmes The Home Show, The Restoration Man, George Clarke's Old House New Home, and George Clarke's Amazing Spaces.

Early life
Clarke was born in Sunderland and brought up in the Washington area. His mother, Anne, worked at Oxclose Comprehensive School, where Clarke was a pupil. His father, a printer died when George was 6, and his mother later remarried. By his own admission, Clarke was a popular but very shy child.

Both Clarke's grandfathers were builders and, after spending school holidays in and around building sites, he decided he wanted to be an architect from the age of 12:

There was nothing else I ever wanted to do. When most of the kids were playing with building blocks and pieces of Lego, I was actually on building sites.

Clarke studied for a BTEC in Building and Construction at Wearside College, Sunderland, before gaining a First Class BA Honours in Architectural Studies and a Certificate in Architectural Practice from Newcastle University School of Architecture, Planning and Landscape, followed by a post-graduate diploma from London's Bartlett School of Architecture. Whilst he was a student, Clarke supported himself financially by renovating people's homes in his spare time.

Career

Architecture
After graduating in 1995, Clarke trained and worked with FaulknerBrowns in Newcastle upon Tyne, before joining world-famous architect Sir Terry Farrell, working in both London and Hong Kong. In 1998, with partner Bobby Desai, he formed his own company, clarke:desai – clients included Simon Fuller and Jamie Oliver.

In 2011, Clarke left clarke:desai and set up a new company George Clarke + Partners, with 25 staff. At the time Clarke commented:

I’ve had a fantastic time at clarke:desai and I’m proud of all the projects we have completed over the years, but, as you can imagine, my media work has taken me in a different direction and I now want to start a new company that isn’t just about architecture, but also covers all aspects of the design, build and property development business. 

The firm has mainly been involved in renovation and refurbishment projects but it has also designed new buildings.

Between 2001 and 2003, Clarke was a visiting lecturer at Newcastle University. He is currently a visiting lecturer at the Nottingham University's School for the Built Environment. 

Clarke has set up a charity organisation called Ministry of Building Innovation and Education (MOBIE) which is designed to train and inspire young people into the innovation and design of homes in the U.K. and abroad. MOBIE also designed a course in partnership with Teesside University.

Television
Clarke's television career came about by chance. He had approached a literary agent after being asked to write a book about architecture, not realising the agency also represented television presenters. He was subsequently asked to screen test for a new Channel 5 programme called Build A New Life in the Country, which had been struggling to find a suitably charismatic building professional to front the show. Clarke was offered the job, and then went on to present two more property shows for Channel 5 before being commissioned to present The Restoration Man for Channel 4.

Since 2004, he has been the main presenter for the following programmes:

Property Dreams (2004), Dream Home Abroad (2005) and Build A New Life in the Country (2005–07), all for Channel 5. The Home Show (2008—), The Restoration Man (2010 —), The Great British Property Scandal (2011), The Great British Property Scandal: Every Empty Counts (2012) and George Clarke's Amazing Spaces (2012—), all for Channel 4 and Old House New Home and Ugly House To Lovely House. In the later part of 2020 he presented a six part series for Channel 4 visiting National Trust properties which were closed during the coronavirus pandemic (George Clarke's National Trust Unlocked).

Books
Clarke is also the author of several books, including: Home Bible (Orion), and Build a New Life: by Creating Your New Home.

Other positions
Clarke was on the judging panel of the Affordable Home Ownership Housing Awards in 2007.

In April 2012, Clarke was appointed as an independent adviser to the government to help bring thousands of empty properties back into use for families in need of stable, secure homes.

Clarke is a patron of the Civic Trust Awards scheme. He is an ambassador for the housing and homeless charity Shelter, as well as a Building Community ambassador for the Prince's Foundation. He is also a supporter of Sunderland A.F.C.

Personal life
Clarke grew up with three younger sisters.

He met his first wife Catriona, a Spanish national, when he undertook renovation work for her brother. The couple were married for over 10 years, and had three children before separating in 2013 and subsequently divorcing.

Clarke subsequently married Katie Morgan Jones in 2018, but reportedly split from her in 2022.

Clarke lives in Notting Hill, West London and Gloucestershire. He has completely renovated his 1910 house in Notting Hill, transforming the interior into a modern home, whilst restoring the exterior to its original appearance.

He still has family in Blackfell, Washington, and Sunderland, and visits the area at least two or three times a year.

Honours
In July 2012, Clarke carried the Olympic torch through Camden after his brother-in-law Swiggy Drummond, who was the original candidate for the honour, died of cancer.

In January 2014, Clarke became the youngest person ever to be awarded honorary membership of the Royal Institution of Chartered Surveyors (Hon RICS). In July 2015, Clarke was conferred with an Honorary Doctorate of Arts from Leeds Beckett University for his contribution to the arts. In September 2015, he received an honorary doctorate from the University of Wolverhampton as a Doctor of Technology and, in December 2015, he received an honorary doctorate from Northumbria University.

Grenfell Tower controversy
On the day of the 2017 Grenfell Tower fire, Clarke, a nearby resident, was filmed by a BBC Newsnight crew (interviewer David Grossman), claiming to have witnessed an act of heroism concerning a child being thrown from an eighth-floor window and being caught by a single individual:Clarke: "One guy caught a kid...[the] kid was thrown out of a window from about the eighth floor, and the guy just caught him...it's amazing...Interviewer: "Really?"Clarke: "yeah, yeah"Interviewer: "You, you saw that?" Clarke: "yeah, yeah...yeah...it's just unbelievable, you know" 

A subsequent Newsnight investigation into the alleged circumstances revealed the initial source of the report to be a live interview being given by a member of the public during the course of the fire at 10:08 on 14 June 2017 to Ryan Hooper, a Press Association reporter who Tweeted it; subsequently it was repeated by other media – The Telegraph, Evening Standard, Daily Star, MailOnline, the Independent, the BBC, and then around the globe. The investigation contacted the emergency services, which had no record of any such event, and explored the physics of a  weight being dropped from eight floors up, with expert opinion on the consequences of such a fall on the body of an infant, and creating a simulation using a bowling ball dropped from a multi-storey car park.

When asked for comment by BBC Newsnight some time after the tragedy, both the initial source of the report and Clarke declined to comment, but Clarke issued a statement: "I don't want to make any comment on it. Nothing whatsoever because it's such a contentious issue and I think it's so hurtful to so many people". The BBC report concluded that they "haven't turned up anything that suggests this amazing event actually happened – indeed all the available evidence points to the opposite conclusion", and characterised it as a phenomenon called false narrative.

References

External links
 Official Website
 
 

1974 births
Living people
People from Washington, Tyne and Wear
Alumni of Newcastle University
Alumni of The Bartlett
Architects from County Durham
English television presenters